Winlock is a lunar impact crater on the far side of the Moon, where it lies to the west of the large walled plain Lorentz. From the Earth this crater is located behind the northwestern limb, and just beyond the parts of the far side that are sometimes brought into view due to libration.

This is a reasonably well-formed crater, although it has suffered some erosion. There is a small crater lying across the rim to the southwest, and a smaller crater across the northeastern rim. The rim edge is otherwise relatively circular with some slight slumping along the inner edge. The interior floor is generally level, and the site where a central peak is usually located is instead occupied by a small craterlet.

Satellite craters
By convention these features are identified on lunar maps by placing the letter on the side of the crater midpoint that is closest to Winlock.

References

 
 
 
 
 
 
 
 
 
 
 
 

Impact craters on the Moon